The Brunei Darussalam Central Bank (BDCB), formerly known as Monetary Authority of Brunei Darussalam (AMBD) is the central bank of Brunei. It was established under the  Monetari Brunei Darussalam Order, 2010, and began operations on 1 January 2011. It succeeded the Brunei Currency and Monetary Board.

History
The Brunei Currency Board was established on June 12, 1967, and the introduction of the Brunei Dollar as the new currency of Brunei in replacing the Malaya and British Borneo dollar after the Currency Union Agreement between Malaysia, Singapore and Brunei was terminated and all three countries issued their own currencies which continued to be interchangeable until May 8, 1973, when Malaysia terminated the agreement with Singapore and Brunei. The Currency Interchangeability Agreement between Singapore and Brunei is still existent. On 27 June 2007, Singapore and Brunei celebrated the 40th anniversary of the Currency Interchangeability Agreement (since 12 June 1967) with the joint-issue of the commemorative $20 notes.

The Brunei Currency Board was dissolved and rechartered under the new name the Brunei Currency and Monetary Board pursuant to Section 3-1 of the Currency and Monetary Order of 2004 on February 1, 2004. It was then succeeded by the Monetary Authority of Brunei Darussalam ( Monetari Brunei Darussalam) in 2011.

By command of His Majesty Sultan Haji Hassanal Bolkiah, the Monetary Authority of Brunei Darussalam has been renamed to the Brunei Darussalam Central Bank (BDCB) on 26 June 2021.

Organisation 
The chairman is Dato Seri Paduka Awang Haji Khairuddin bin Haji Abdul Hamid, The deputy chairman is Yang Mulia
Pengiran Datin Seri Paduka Hajah Zety Sufina binti Pengiran Dato Paduka Haji Sani .

See also

 Ministry of Finance and Economy (Brunei)

References

External links
 

Government of Brunei
Economy of Brunei
Brunei
Banks of Brunei
2004 establishments in Brunei
Banks established in 2011
Government agencies of Brunei